Veronika Kudermetova and Aryna Sabalenka were the defending champions, but chose not to participate this year. 

Ankita Raina and Karman Thandi won the title against Olga Doroshina and Natela Dzalamidze, when their opponents retired in the match tiebreak because of a hamstring injury suffered by Dzalamidze.

Seeds

Draw

Draw

References
Main Draw

OEC Taipei WTA Challenger - Doubles
Taipei WTA Ladies Open